Holme Beck is a watercourse in the Tong ward of the City of Bradford, West Yorkshire, England. It drains a shallow valley east of the watershed between Bradford and Leeds. Holme Beck begins in the village with no evidence of any continuation on the other side of the canal or motorway. Holme Beck is the main carrier for village drainage, it runs beneath the West Coast Main Line and then through the large marsh area of Holme Moss before joining the River Bela.

Course 

The source of Holme Beck was originally located at a height of just above  a.s.l. on the grounds of today's Knowleswood Primary School in Holme Wood. The stream passed the area of the Valley Natural Play Park and crossed Ned Lane. Little is visible now of its upper course, as it has been covered up.

Holme Beck becomes visible east of Ned Lane and follows an approximately eastern course until it is joined by a tributary stream from the north. Passing Charles Pit, a former coal mine which was in operation from 1884 to 1925, it turns slightly towards east-southeast, passes some old mine workings on its right bank and passes under the bridge of Scholebrook Lane. Below the bridge and upon entering Park Wood, it is joined from the southwest by Kit Wood Beck which is named after a woodland on its course and whose source is north of Tong High School.

Holme Beck turns east-northeast just south of Scholebrook Farm and is joined from the south by Peter's Shrog, a stream coming from a source east of Tong High School. From this junction it continues through Park Wood until its confluence with Tyersal Beck at the edge of Fulneck Golf Course at just below  a.s.l. The joint stream continues as Pudsey Beck.

References

Rivers of Bradford